Blue Valley USD 384 is a public unified school district headquartered in Randolph, Kansas, United States.  The district includes the communities of Randolph, Olsburg, Fostoria, May Day, Winkler, and nearby rural areas.

Schools
The school district operates the following schools:
 Blue Valley High/Middle School in Randolph
 McCormick Elementary School in Olsburg

See also
 Kansas State Department of Education
 Kansas State High School Activities Association
 List of high schools in Kansas
 List of unified school districts in Kansas

References

External links
 

School districts in Kansas